Constantine II (February 316 – 340) was Roman emperor from 337 to 340. Son of Constantine the Great and co-emperor alongside his brothers, his attempt to exert his perceived rights of primogeniture led to his death in a failed invasion of Italy in 340.

Career 
The eldest son of Constantine the Great and Fausta, Constantine II was born in Arles in February 316 and raised as a Christian.

Caesar 
On 1 March 317, he was made Caesar. In 323, at the age of seven, he took part in his father's campaign against the Sarmatians. At age ten, he became commander of Gaul, following the death of his half-brother Crispus. An inscription dating to 330 records the title of Alamannicus, so it is probable that his generals won a victory over the Alamanni.  His military career continued when Constantine I made him field commander during the 332 campaign against the Goths.

Augustus 
Following the death of his father in 337, Constantine II initially became emperor jointly with his brothers Constantius II and Constans, with the empire divided between them and their cousins, the caesars Dalmatius and Hannibalianus.  This arrangement barely survived Constantine I's death, as his sons arranged the slaughter of most of the rest of the family by the army.  As a result, the three brothers gathered together in Pannonia and there, on 9 September 337, divided the Roman world among themselves. Constantine, proclaimed Augustus by the troops received Gaul, Britannia and Hispania.

He was soon involved in the struggle between factions rupturing the unity of the Christian Church.  The Western portion of the empire, under the influence of the Popes in Rome, favoured Nicene Christianity over Arianism, and through their intercession they convinced Constantine to free Athanasius, allowing him to return to Alexandria. This action aggravated Constantius II, who was a committed supporter of Arianism.

Constantine was initially the guardian of his younger brother Constans, whose portion of the empire was Italia, Africa and Illyricum. Constantine soon complained that he had not received the amount of territory that was his due as the eldest son.  Annoyed that Constans had received Thrace and Macedonia after the death of Dalmatius, Constantine demanded that Constans hand over the African provinces, to which he agreed in order to maintain a fragile peace.  Soon, however, they began quarreling over which parts of the African provinces belonged to Carthage, and thus Constantine, and which belonged to Italy, and therefore Constans.

Further complications arose when Constans came of age and Constantine, who had grown accustomed to dominating his younger brother, would not relinquish the guardianship. In 340 Constantine marched into Italy at the head of his troops to claim territory from Constans. Constans, at that time in Dacia, detached and sent a select and disciplined body of his Illyrian troops, stating that he would follow them in person with the remainder of his forces.  Constantine was engaged in military operations and was killed by Constans's generals in an ambush outside Aquileia. Constans then took control of his deceased brother's realm.

Family tree

Emperors are shown with a rounded-corner border with their dates as Augusti, names with a thicker border appear in both sections

1: Constantine's parents and half-siblings

2: Constantine's children

Gallery

References

Sources

Primary sources
 Zosimus, Historia Nova, Book 2 Historia Nova
 Aurelius Victor, Epitome de Caesaribus
 Eutropius, Breviarium ab urbe condita

Secondary sources
 DiMaio, Michael, and Robert Frakes, "Constantine II (337–340 A.D.)", D.I.R.
 
 Gibbon, Edward. Decline & Fall of the Roman Empire (1888)
 Lewis, William (2020), "Constantine II and His Brothers: The Civil War of AD 340", in Nicholas Baker-Brian and Shaun Tougher (eds.), The Sons of Constantine, AD 337–361: In the Shadows of Constantine and Julian. Palgrave Macmillan. Cham. .

External links

316 births
340 deaths
4th-century Roman emperors
Imperial Roman consuls
Constantinian dynasty
Claudii
Flavii
Roman emperors killed in battle
Tetrarchy
Sons of Roman emperors